Soccer Republic is RTÉ's main football television programme. It is shown on RTÉ Two on Monday nights during the Irish football season, showing highlights of recent matches in Irish football's top division, the League of Ireland Premier Division and also features on the Republic of Ireland team.
The show is a re-branded version of the previous highlights programme Monday Night Soccer which aired from 2008 until 2013.

Soccer Republic is presented by RTÉ presenter Peter Collins.
The first edition of Soccer Republic was screened on RTÉ Two at 11.05pm on 10 March 2014.

Show
The show is broadcast weekly on Monday evenings live from RTÉ Studio 6. Highlights of every League of Ireland Premier Division game are shown, with interviews with the managers and players, followed by studio analysis. It is normally broadcast on Mondays at 11:05 PM to 12:05 AM. However, while the 2014 FIFA World Cup coverage was on RTÉ Two, Soccer Republic was only half an hour long from 7:30 PM to 8:00 PM on Monday.

Presenters and commentators
The following is a full list of guests on the show.
Martin O'Neill
Roy Keane
Paul McGrath
Ray Houghton
Ronnie Whelan
Kenny Cunningham
Keith Gillespie
Alex McLeish

The following is a list of regular panelists on the show,
Richie Sadlier
Pat Fenlon
Michael Healy-Rae
Brian Kerr
Tony McDonnell

References

2014 Irish television series debuts
Irish sports television series
RTÉ Sport
RTÉ original programming
Association football on Irish television